Meridarchis caementaria is a moth in the family Carposinidae. It was described by Edward Meyrick in 1911. It is found on Aldabra in the Seychelles.

This species has a wingspan of 13 mm.
The head is whitish ochreous sprinkled with grey. The forewings are pale greyish ochreous sprinkled with grey and blackish, more whitish ochreous on margins; seven small spots of blackish irroration (sprinkles) on the costa, two in the disc at two-fifths and two-thirds, one on submedian fold before tornus and several along termen.

References

Carposinidae
Moths described in 1911